Melville "Mel" Spence (2 January 1936 – 28 October 2012) was a Jamaican sprinter who competed in the 1956 Summer Olympics and in the 1964 Summer Olympics. He is the twin brother of Mal Spence, an Olympic sprint medalist.

He was a relay silver medalist at the 1955 Pan American Games and was runner-up in the individual 400 m event at the 1963 Pan American Games. He was part of the winning Jamaican 4×400 metres relay team at the 1962 Central American and Caribbean Games.

References

External links 
 

1936 births
2012 deaths
Jamaican male sprinters
Olympic athletes of Jamaica
Athletes (track and field) at the 1956 Summer Olympics
Athletes (track and field) at the 1964 Summer Olympics
Twin sportspeople
Pan American Games gold medalists for the British West Indies
Pan American Games gold medalists for Jamaica
Pan American Games medalists in athletics (track and field)
Athletes (track and field) at the 1955 Pan American Games
Athletes (track and field) at the 1959 Pan American Games
Athletes (track and field) at the 1963 Pan American Games
Commonwealth Games gold medallists for Jamaica
Commonwealth Games medallists in athletics
Athletes (track and field) at the 1958 British Empire and Commonwealth Games
Athletes (track and field) at the 1962 British Empire and Commonwealth Games
Athletes (track and field) at the 1966 British Empire and Commonwealth Games
Central American and Caribbean Games gold medalists for Jamaica
Competitors at the 1962 Central American and Caribbean Games
Competitors at the 1966 Central American and Caribbean Games
Central American and Caribbean Games medalists in athletics
Medalists at the 1955 Pan American Games
Medalists at the 1959 Pan American Games
Medalists at the 1963 Pan American Games
Medallists at the 1962 British Empire and Commonwealth Games